Khasagt Khairkhan is a mountain of the Gobi-Altai Mountains and located in the Govi-Altai Province in Mongolia. It has elevation of 3,578 metres (11,739 ft).

See also 
 List of Ultras of Central Asia
 List of mountains in Mongolia

References

External links 
 "Khasgat Khairkhan Uul, Mongolia" on Peakbagger

Mountains of Mongolia
Altai Mountains
Govi-Altai Province